The grey-breasted partridge (Arborophila orientalis), also known as the white-faced hill partridge, or Horsfield's hill partridge, is a bird species in the family Phasianidae.

It is endemic to highland forest in eastern Java, Indonesia.

Measuring , this species is a stocky, short-legged bird. Its mostly grey plumage is barred on the lower back and tail. It has a black crown and nape, and conspicuous white forehead, cheeks and throat. Bare skin around the eyes is red. The bill is black and the legs are red.

Some authorities include the Malayan, Roll's and Sumatran partridges as subspecies of the grey-breasted partridge.

The grey-breasted partridge is threatened by habitat loss.

References

External links

 
 
 
 

grey-breasted partridge
Birds of Java
grey-breasted partridge
Taxonomy articles created by Polbot